The Iwaidjan or Yiwaidjan languages are a small family of non-Pama–Nyungan Australian Aboriginal languages spoken in the Cobourg Peninsula region of Western Arnhem Land.

In 1997 Nicholas Evans proposed an Arnhem Land family that includes the Iwaidjan languages, though their inclusion is not accepted in Bowern (2011).

The Iwaidjan languages

Garig and Ilgar are two almost identical dialects. Manangkari may be a dialect of Maung.

Dixon (2002) considers Warrkbi demonstrated, but Iwaidjic (Warrkbi-Maung) and Iwaidjan to be speculative. He predicts that working out the histories of the languages will be a "profound challenge", regardless of whether they are a genealogical family or a language area.

Marrgu and Wurrugu, previously lumped in with Iwaidjan, have little in common with it and may turn out to be a separate family.

Status
As of 1998, Iwaidja was spoken by about 150 people in the community of Minjilang on Croker Island, alongside English, Kunwinjku and Maung. Maung is primarily spoken in the community of Warruwi on Goulburn Island, and it too has about 150 speakers. Both languages are still being learnt by children. More recent assessments of the status of Iwaidja and Maung are that both have around 200 speakers and are spoken daily by a full age range of people.

All the other Iwaidjan languages are close to extinction. , Amurdak had three remaining speakers and Garig and Ilgar three speakers between them. However, some of these languages have younger people who, while not fluent, can aid in translating old recordings in an attempt to archive or revive the language.

Phonology
The Iwaidjan languages have similar phoneme inventories. Exceptions are noted below the tables.

Vowels

Consonants

Maung lacks the two flapped laterals, which are quite unusual among Australian languages. Also unusual is the velar approximant , which is an areal feature shared with Tiwi and Kunbarlang.

Relationships with other languages
The vocabularies of all the Iwaidjan languages contain loanwords from Macassarese and Malay, both Malayo-Polynesian languages from Indonesia. Iwaidja and Maung have also borrowed heavily from Kunwijku, another Australian language of the Gunwingguan family.

While the Iwaidjan languages share a number of features with other non-Pama–Nyungan language families, it is uncertain which they are closest related to. Ross has proposed that they form part of an Arnhem Land family.

Vocabulary
Capell (1940) lists the following basic vocabulary items (with Amarag words from Capell 1942)

The following basic vocabulary terms are collated from Capell (1940), Capell (1942), and Evans (2000):

{| class="wikitable sortable"
! gloss !! Maung !! Iwaidja !! Amarag
|-
! man
|  ||  || 
|-
! woman
|  ||  || 
|-
! head
|  ||  || 
|-
! eye
|  ||  || 
|-
! nose
|  ||  || 
|-
! mouth
|  ||  || 
|-
! tongue
|  ||  || 
|-
! stomach
|  ||  || 
|-
! bone
|  ||  || 
|-
! blood
|  ||  || 
|-
! kangaroo
|  ||  || 
|-
! opossum
|  ||  || 
|-
! emu
|  ||  || 
|-
! crow
|  ||  || 
|-
! fly
|  ||  || 
|-
! sun
|  ||  || 
|-
! moon
|  ||  || 
|-
! fire
|  ||  || 
|-
! smoke
|  ||  || 
|-
! water
|  ||  || 
|}

Notes

See also 
*

References

External links 

 Examples of the Iwaidja language (many are text only out of respect for the dead)

 
Language families
Non-Pama-Nyungan languages
Indigenous Australian languages in the Northern Territory